Maryam Shahabi (25 October 1914 – 4 October 2005), was a Persian aristocrat and major landowner.

Background
Shahabi was a descendant of Teymour Lang. Her ancestors led the Timurid dynasty for generations and her mother was descended from Mohammad Shah Qajar.

She is the granddaughter of Ali Mardan Khan, Nuzrat ol-Molk and his wife Ashraf us-Sultana Qajar

Private life
She married Etemad Shahabi and had four issues:

Helene Shahabi, married Bozorgmehr Sadr and has issues:
Hedieh Sadr
Ramin Sadr
Khosrow Shahabi, married Roya Akhavan and has issues:
Maryam Shahabi
Teymour Shahabi
Cyrus Shahabi
Nosrat Shahabi, married Ali-Naghi Farmanfarmaian and has issues:
Fati Farman-Farmaian
Abdol Hamid Farman-Farmaian
Abou Farman-Farmaian
Mahnaz Shahabi, married Essy Tayebi and has issues:
Amirali Tayebi
Amirreza Tayebi

Sources
Agheli, Bagher, Teymourtash Dar Sahneye-h Siasate-h Iran ("Teimurtash in the Political Arena of Iran") (Javeed: Tehran, 1371).
Ansari, Ali, Modern Iran Since 1921: The Pahlavis and After (Longman: London, 2003) .

References
 Amirteymour, Kalali, Shahabi Genealogy, 20-05-2008

Iranian royalty
Qajar princesses
2005 deaths
1914 births
20th-century Iranian people